Saginaw is a small city in Tarrant County, Texas, United States, and an Inner suburb of Fort Worth. The population was 24,310 in 2019. Saginaw is a Home rule municipality.

History
The town was renamed Saginaw in 1882 by Jarvis J. Green (after his first choice of "Pontiac" was rejected by the United States Postal Service), who had lived and worked on Saginaw Street in Pontiac, Michigan.  The name Saginaw comes from the Ojibwe language and means "to flow out."  It is also the name of a river, a bay, and a city in Michigan.

On March 13, 1989, Evergreen International Airlines Flight 17 crashed near Saginaw, killing both pilots (the aircraft's only occupants) on board.

Geography
According to the United States Census Bureau, the city has a total area of 7.5 square miles (19.4 km), all of it land.

Demographics

2020 census

As of the 2020 United States census, there were 23,890 people, 8,343 households, and 6,292 families residing in the city.

2010 census
According to Census data in 2010, There were 6,546 households, of which 44.6% had children under the age of 18 living with them, 62.9% were married couples living together, 12.3% had a female householder with no husband present, and 19.6% were non-families. 15.6% of all households were made up of individuals, and 4.2% had someone living alone who was 65 years of age or older. The average household size was 3.03 and the average family size was 3.38.

2017
According to ESRI data in 2017, there were 21,889 people, 6546 households, and 5525 families residing in the city. The Population density was 2,900.0 per square mile. There were 7,315 housing units. The racial makeup of the city was 79.4% White, 5.2% African American, .8% Native American, 2.3% Asian, .1% Pacific Isander, 8.6% some other race alone, 3.5% two or more races. Hispanic were 27.8% of the population.

The age distribution was 0–4 7.8%, 5–9 7.8%, 10–14 8.0%, 15–24 13.6%, 18+ 72.0%, 25–34 14.1%, 35–44 14.5%, 45–54 14.0%, 55–64 10.7%, 65–74 6.7%, 75–84 2.3%, 85+ .6%. The median age was 34.

There was 10,731 males and 11,154 females.

Out of the population 25+ the educational attainment for the city was 3.6% less than 9th grade, 3.9% highschool no diploma, 27.6% highschool graduate, 5.8% GED, 28% Some college no degree, 8.4% Associate degree, 17.2% Bachelor's degree, 5.4% Graduate/Professional Degree.

The median household income was $75,617, the per capita income was $28,320.  In 2010 Male full-time, year-round workers had a median income of $52,939 versus $38,899 for females.  About 3.9% of families and 4.2% of the population were below the poverty line, including 5.9% of those under age 18 and 2.8% of those age 65 or over.

The employment rate was 94.7%. 60.9% of the population held white collar jobs: 12.6% in Management/Business/Finance, 19.1% in Professional, 11.4% in Sales, 17.7% in Admin Support, 17.0% in Services. 22.1% of the population held blue collar jobs: 0.8% in Farming/Forestry/Fishing, 2.6% in Construction, 5.1% in Installation/Maintenance/Repair, 4.1% in Production, and 9.6% in Transportation/Material Moving.

Economy

Top employers
Saginaw has two major railroad lines (one operated by Union Pacific and another by BNSF) running through the middle of the city, Rail-served heavy industry is located along these lines. Saginaw has a prominent heavy industrial base when compared to other suburban cities of the same size. Saginaw is known for its "Train & Grain" heritage, due to the presence of the railroads and two large flour mills located within the city limits. Large grain elevators (visible from miles away) are a prominent feature in the center of the city. According to Saginaw's 2018 Comprehensive Annual Financial Report, the top employers in the city are:

Education
No colleges or universities are present in this small community, but the city lies within driving distance to Fort Worth and the rest of the Dallas/Fort Worth metropolitan area, which contains a number of colleges and universities including the Tarrant County College system.

Saginaw is served by the Eagle Mountain-Saginaw Independent School District. The four high schools in the district are Boswell High School, Saginaw High School, Chisholm Trail High School, and Watson High School/Alternative Discipline Center (the last of which is targeted to at-risk students.)

Notable people 
 Brec Bassinger, actress
 Janet Gunn, actress
 Brad Hawpe, MLB Player
 Angela Stanford, LPGA Golfer
 Kirk Watson, politician

References

External links
City of Saginaw official website

Cities in Tarrant County, Texas
Cities in Texas
Dallas–Fort Worth metroplex